Oliver Dolan (c. 1894 – 19 March 1985) was an English professional rugby league footballer who played in the 1920s and 1930s.

Club career
Dolan spent his entire career at St Helens Recs, joining the club in 1920 until his retirement in 1937.

International honours
Dolan won a cap for England while at St. Helens Recs in 1932 against Wales.

Dolan was selected for Great Britain while at St. Helens Recs for the 1928 Great Britain Lions tour of Australia and New Zealand.

References

External links

1890s births
1985 deaths
England national rugby league team players
English rugby league players
Great Britain national rugby league team players
Place of birth missing
Place of death missing
Rugby league hookers
St Helens Recreation RLFC players